James P. Tucker, Jr. (December 31, 1934 – April 26, 2013), also known as Big Jim Tucker, was an American journalist and author of Jim Tucker's Bilderberg Diary who began to focus on the Bilderberg Group in 1975.

Tucker has been described as a "veteran Bilderberg observer",  "the doyen of Bilderberg hunters", as "an oddball Washington journalist", and as a "right-wing conspiracy investigator". Tucker died from complications due to a fall, according to his obituary.

Career

Journalism
Tucker was a sports journalist with a newspaper in Washington from 1975 until his death.

Tucker started writing for the populist newspaper The Spotlight in 1975, and continued as a contributor until its closure in 2001. Shortly after the paper's closure, Tucker and many former Spotlight employees founded the similarly-toned American Free Press.

Bilderberg Group

1990s
Tucker said he was able to write the "advance story" on the downfall of Margaret Thatcher and, later, about the rise of Bill Clinton when he attended the Bilderberg meeting at Baden-Baden in Germany in 1991. He said Thatcher was removed from office because she "didn't like it [the one meeting of the Bilderbergs she attended]" and that as a result they "replaced her" with a trapeze artist from the same party". According to Tucker's "close paraphrasing" of a conversation some years later, Thatcher told him it was "a tribute to be denounced by them" at a function in Washington. Thatcher actually attended at least three Bilderberg meetings.

Tucker's efforts to infiltrate the 1999 Bilderberg meeting at the Hotel Caesar Park in Sintra, Portugal were chronicled by British reporter Jon Ronson in his book, Them: Adventures with Extremists and broadcast as part of Channel 4's The Secret Rulers of the World series. Tucker told Ronson "They exist and they're not playing pinochle in there".

2000s
In 2005, Tucker wrote Jim Tucker's Bilderberg Diary published by the American Free Press where he was an editor, a book chronicling his thirty-plus years of exposing the Bilderberg Group.

After the 2006 Bilderberg meeting in Ottawa  Tucker claimed that he "was able to report that in the year ahead many hundreds of thousands of American home owners would lose their homes". Tucker said another person present remarked "the stupid jerks deserve it" while another responded to the comment by saying "That's awful cruel".

Tucker is featured prominently in a film made by radio host Alex Jones, Endgame: Blueprint for Global Enslavement (2007), which partially deals with the 2006 Bilderberg conference at the Brookstreet Hotel in Ottawa, Ontario, Canada. Both Tucker and Jones are featured in the documentary film, New World Order (2009). Charlie Skelton encountered him in 2009 while researching that year's Bilderberg.

References

1934 births
2013 deaths
American male journalists
20th-century American journalists
21st-century American journalists
20th-century American male writers
21st-century American male writers
Journalists from North Carolina
Writers from Charlotte, North Carolina
Accidental deaths from falls
Accidental deaths in Virginia